Sverre Mauritzen (born 6 October 1943) is a Norwegian diplomat and politician for the Conservative Party (Høyre). He was a member of the Parliament of Norway from 1981 to 1993, representing Rogaland.

References

1943 births
Living people
Politicians from Stavanger
Members of the Storting
Conservative Party (Norway) politicians
Rogaland politicians
Norwegian diplomats
20th-century Norwegian politicians